Act V: Hymns with the Devil in Confessional is the seventh studio album by American rock band The Dear Hunter. It was released on September 9, 2016, via Cave and Canary Goods and Equal Vision Records The album is the fifth installment in a six-part series. It follows the conclusion of Act IV: Rebirth in Reprise, in which the story's main character is confronted by his nemesis and forced into blackmail.

Development
Roughly a month prior to the announcement of Act V: Hymns with the Devil in Confessional, Casey Crescenzo began performing a new song entitled "Light" at live shows during the band's early 2016 tour. The song was not accompanied by the full band.

On June 20, 2016, the band mailed out numerous packages to fans who had purchased the "Lifetime" membership in 2010. These lifetime members received a sheet of laminated material in the appearance of a postcard. The postcard had the words "HYMNS WITH THE DEVIL IN CONFESSIONAL" printed across one side, and on the other a message signed by a "Mr. Usher". The postcard also had grooves that could be played on a turntable, revealing a spoken message in relation to the story accompanied by a reprise of the end of the song "City Escape" from Act I: The Lake South, the River North.

The card also contained a URL to the website "hymnswiththedevil.com", which contained a picture of a burnt playing card and a countdown timer set to end on June 22, 2016, at 1:00 pm EDT. At the end of the countdown The Dear Hunter officially announced Act V: Hymns with the Devil in Confessional on their website and via Facebook, Twitter, and Instagram. Preorders for the album, and a new single "Gloria" were made available immediately.

In addition to the announcement of the album, Crescenzo put a personal message on the website. This message discussed his thoughts on his career, the production of Act V and the future of Act VI: 

On August 5, a single entitled "The Revival" was released. "Light" was also released as a single on August 25.

Track listing

Personnel
 Casey Crescenzo – lead vocals, piano, guitar, acoustic guitar, rhodes, organ, synth, aux. percussion
 Nick Crescenzo – drums, percussion
 Rob Parr – guitar, acoustic guitar, vocals, piano, organ
 Nick Sollecito – bass guitar
 Max Tousseau – guitar, synth

Additional personnel
 Tivoli Breckenridge – vocals
 Judy Crescenzo – vocals
 Phil Crescenzo – banjo on "The Most Cursed of Hands"
Gavin Castleton – piano on "Mr. Usher", co-lead vocals on "The Haves Have Naught", additional synth and programming
 Brad Kleyla: trombone on "Mr. Usher"
 Chris Gagnon: alto and tenor sax on "The Revival", "Mr. Usher"
 Ben Shaw: bari sax on "The Revival", "Mr. Usher"
 Manny Mendez: trumpet on "Mr. Usher"

Charts

References

2016 albums
The Dear Hunter albums
Equal Vision Records albums
Albums produced by Casey Crescenzo
Concept albums
Rock operas
Sequel albums